is a 1951 Japanese drama by Yasujirō Ozu. Like most of Ozu's post-war films, Early Summer deals with issues ranging from communication problems between generations to the rising role of women in post-war Japan. The plot concerns Noriko, who lives contentedly in an extended family household that includes her parents and her brother's family, but an uncle's visit prompts the family to find her a husband.

Plot

Noriko, a secretary in Tokyo, lives in Kamakura, Kanagawa with her extended Mamiya family, which includes her parents Shūkichi and Shige, her older brother Kōichi, a physician, his wife Fumiko, and their two young sons Minoru and Isamu.

An elderly uncle arrives and reminds everyone that Noriko, who is 28, should marry. At work, Noriko's boss Satake recommends a match for her with a forty-year-old friend of his, Mr. Manabe, a businessman and golfer. Noriko's friends are divided into two groups —- the married and the unmarried—who tease one another endlessly, with Aya Tamura being her close ally in the unmarried group. Noriko's family gently pressures Noriko into accepting the match proposed by Satake, agreeing that it is time for her to marry and believing that the match proposed is a good one for someone her age.

Childhood friend Kenkichi Yabe, a doctor, widower, and father to a young daughter, arranges to have tea with Noriko and gives her a sheaf of wheat. The sheaf is a gift from a brother who was killed during World War II and who had asked Yabe to deliver it to Noriko in case he did not return. Later, Yabe is posted to Akita, in northern Honshu. Akita is considered so rural that Noriko and Aya make fun of the area's accent. However, when Yabe's mother Tami impulsively asks Noriko to marry Yabe and follow them in their northward resettlement, Noriko agrees. When Noriko reveals her decision, her family is quietly devastated. They hint to her that the match is a poor one. When Noriko persists, the family is forced to live with their disappointment.

The family gradually accepts Noriko's choice with quiet resignation, and before she moves on, the family takes a photograph together. Noriko's parents console themselves that Noriko and Kenkichi will move back to Tokyo in a few years' time, reuniting the family. Meanwhile, the parents move to a rural region to stay with Noriko's elderly uncle. In the final scene, Noriko's parents watch a bride pass down the country road in her traditional costume. The final shot is of a barley field ripening around.

Cast

Reception
Early Summer is highly regarded by today's critics. Rotten Tomatoes reports 100% approval among 11 critics, with an average rating of 8.90/10. Aggregation site They Shoot Pictures, Don't They has found it to be one of the 1,000 most acclaimed films in history. In 2009 the film was ranked at No. 106 on the list of the Greatest Japanese Films of All Time by Japanese film magazine Kinema Junpo.

DVD release 

In 2004, the Criterion Collection released with a new high-definition digital transfer, with restored image and sound and new English subtitle translation. Also included were the original theatrical trailer, an audio commentary by Donald Richie, Ozu’s Films from Behind-the-Scenes, a conversation about Ozu and his working methods between child-actor and sound technician Kojirō Suematsu, assistant cameraman Takashi Kawamata, and Ozu producer Shizuo Yamanouchi, and essays by David Bordwell and Jim Jarmusch.

In 2010, the BFI released a Region 2 Dual Format Edition (Blu-ray + DVD). Included with this release is a standard definition presentation of What Did the Lady Forget?

References

Further reading 
 Classic Japanese Screenplays: Ozu Yasujirō's Early Summer translated by D.A. Rajakaruna. Simasahita Sankha Mudrana Silpiyo; (1997), 
 Ozu Yasujirō's Two Post-War Films: Late Spring, Early Summer translated by D.A. Rajakaruna. Godage International Publishers, (2006)

External links 

 
 
 Reviews at Rotten Tomatoes.
 Early Summer  at the Japanese Movie Database
 Voted #94 on The Arts and Faith Top 100 Films (2010)
 Early Summer at Ozu-san.com
Early Summer an essay by David Bordwell at the Criterion Collection

Films set in Kamakura
1951 films
1951 drama films
Japanese drama films
1950s Japanese-language films
Films directed by Yasujirō Ozu
Shochiku films
Best Film Kinema Junpo Award winners
Japanese black-and-white films
Films with screenplays by Yasujirō Ozu
Films with screenplays by Kogo Noda
1950s Japanese films